Li Fuchun (May 22, 1900 – January 9, 1975) was a Chinese Communist revolutionary and politician. He served as a Vice Premier of the People's Republic of China.

Biography
Li Fuchun was born in Changsha, Hunan Province. After completing middle school in his home province, in 1919 he traveled to France to attend a work-study program and here he started his political activity. Fascinated by Marxism, in 1921 he joined the Socialist Youth of China and, in 1922, the Chinese Communist Party (CCP). The following year he married Cai Chang, Cai Hesen's sister. In 1925 he went to study in the Soviet Union, but he returned in China to take part at the Northern Expedition, serving as head of the political division of the National Revolutionary Army's 2nd Army and acting CCP secretary of Jiangxi Province. It was in this period that he met Mao Zedong, working with him at the Peasant Movement Training Institute.

Li Fuchun took part at all the Communist Party's major campaigns, including the Long March, during which he was vice-director of the General Political Department of the Red Army and political commissar. He later served as secretary of the CCP Committee for Shaanxi–Gansu–Ningxia. During the Second Sino-Japanese War, he held a number of jobs, including deputy head of the CCP Central Organization Department, head of the CCP Central Economic and Financial Department, and director of the General Office. In 1945 he was elected member of the CCP Central Committee.

During the 1945–1949 Liberation War (the final showdown between Communists and Nationalists), he had an important role in ruling Northern China, serving simultaneously as secretary of the CCP Manchuria Sub-Bureau, standing committee member and deputy secretary of the CCP Northeast Bureau, vice-chairman of the Northeast People's Government and deputy political commissar of the Northeast Military Region.

With the establishment of the People's Republic of China, both Li Fuchun and Cai Chang were transferred to Beijing. While she served as chairwoman of the All-China Women's Federation (a post she held until 1978), Li Fuchun was appointed deputy head of the Central Economic and Financial Commission under Chen Yun and Minister of Heavy Industry. In 1954 he was promoted to vice-premier and chairman of the State Planning Commission, with the task of overseeing socialist economy planning in China. In 1956 he was also appointed member of the CCP Politburo, and co-opted in the CCP Secretariat in 1958.

At the start of the Cultural Revolution, during a reshuffle of the Party's central authority at the 11th Plenary Session of the 8th CCP Central Committee in August 1966, Li Fuchun was elected to the top Politburo Standing Committee. However, he started to manifest his intolerance towards the course of the Cultural Revolution. During a "general report conference of the Centre’s political work" in October 1966, Mao Zedong said of him: "Li Fuchun has been asked to rest for a year. Even I do not know who is in charge of the Planning Commission. Fuchun respects the Party discipline. He told some things to the Secretariat which were not reported to me." Later, in February 1967 he openly attacked the Cultural Revolution during a meeting along with other top leaders like Chen Yi, Li Xiannian and Nie Rongzhen; as a result, they were labeled as the February Countercurrent and thoroughly criticized as revisionists.

Despite being part of the "February Countercurrent", Li Fuchun was elected to the 9th CCP Central Committee in 1969. After the fall of Lin Biao in 1971, Mao Zedong declared that the "February Countercurrent" was a closed chapter, and so Li Fuchun was completely rehabilitated. He was elected to the 10th CCP Central Committee in 1973 and also to the 4th National People's Congress in 1974, but he could not attend it as he died on January 9, 1975, just 4 days before its first session. He is still regarded as one of the main founders of China's socialist economy.

See also
 Historical Museum of French-Chinese Friendship

|-

|-

|-

1900 births
1975 deaths
Politicians from Changsha
Chinese Communist Party politicians from Hunan
People of the Cultural Revolution
Republic of China politicians from Hunan
People's Republic of China politicians from Hunan
Members of the 8th Politburo Standing Committee of the Chinese Communist Party
Members of the Secretariat of the Chinese Communist Party
Communist University of the Toilers of the East alumni
Burials at Babaoshan Revolutionary Cemetery